is a shoot 'em up game released by G.rev in 2012 for the Nintendo 3DS. It was directed by Hiroshi Iuchi, famous for his seminal shmups Radiant Silvergun and Ikaruga. Unlike many worldwide releases, the game wasn't released in Canada and the developer was only notified that they would not be able to, late in the preparation process.

Gameplay 
The game puts the player in command of a tank that must shoot enemies in succession.

Development and release 
The game was released in North America, excluding Canada, in June 2013, and July 2013 in Europe. The developer was surprised by the failure to release in Canada and did not know if, or when, it would release there.

Reception 

Kokuga received positive reviews from critics upon release. On Metacritic, the game holds a score of 77/100 based on 14 reviews, indicating "generally favorable reviews".

References

Further reading

External links 

2012 video games
Multidirectional shooters
Tank simulation video games
Video games developed in Japan
Video games scored by Manabu Namiki
Nintendo 3DS games
Nintendo 3DS eShop games
Nintendo 3DS-only games
G.rev games